The Duchess of Duke Street is a BBC television drama series set in London between the late 1800s and 1925. It was created by John Hawkesworth, previously the producer of the ITV period drama Upstairs, Downstairs. It starred Gemma Jones as Louisa Leyton Trotter, the eponymous "Duchess" who works her way up from servant to renowned cook to proprietor of the upper-class Bentinck Hotel in Duke Street, St. James's, in London.

The story is loosely based on the real-life career of Rosa Lewis (née Ovenden), the "Duchess of Jermyn Street", who ran the Cavendish Hotel in London, at the corner of Duke St, St. James's. When the show first aired, there were many people who still remembered her, as she lived until 1952. According to census returns, she was born in Leyton, Essex, to a watchmaker. In the series, Louisa's family name is Leyton, and her father is a clockmaker.

The programme lasted for two series totalling 31 episodes, shown in 1976 and 1977. Shown later on PBS in the United States, it was nominated for an Emmy Award for Outstanding Limited Series in 1980. The theme music was composed by Alexander Faris.

Plot summary

Beautiful but low-born Louisa Leyton has one driving ambition: to become a great cook. She finds employment as a cook in the household of Lord Henry Norton. His handsome, wealthy, aristocratic nephew, Charlie Tyrrell, attempts to seduce her, but she rebuffs him. Louisa manages to convince Lord Norton's sexist French chef, Monsieur Alex, into accepting her as his apprentice.

When Louisa is unexpectedly called upon to prepare a dinner by herself, she catches the eye of one of the guests, Edward, the Prince of Wales, who admires both her cooking and her appearance.  After the dinner, Louisa is pressured into becoming Edward's mistress.  Against her own wishes, she agrees to marry Lord Norton's head butler, Augustus "Gus" Trotter, to maintain the appearance of respectability and to protect the royal reputation.  Gus and Louisa are given a house, and her involvement with the prince commences.  In time, Edward's mother, Queen Victoria, dies. Edward assumes the throne as King Edward VII, causing him to end his relationship with Louisa.

Louisa's shaky marriage to Gus becomes strained, both from her affair with the prince and her great success as a chef.  In an effort to help him recover his pride, Louisa purchases the Bentinck Hotel and talks a reluctant Gus into managing it. Before long, abetted by his sister, he lets the authority go to his head. His arrogance alienates the staff and, more importantly, the guests.  Once Louisa discovers that he has lavishly entertained his friends and driven away the guests, she throws both him and his meddling sister out. Then she discovers, to her horror, the mountain of bills he has left unpaid.

With only Mary, one of Lord Norton's servants, to assist her, she sets to work to pay the debts, taking any and all cooking jobs, however humble, but finally she collapses from overwork in the street very early one morning. Charlie Tyrrell is passing by (leaving a late-night assignation) and takes her back to the Bentinck.  Once he learns of Louisa's financial woes, he convinces her to allow him to help her to by becoming a silent partner in the hotel.

Louisa keeps one of the Bentinck's previous employees, the elderly head waiter Merriman, and hires the brisk, soldierly Starr, who is always accompanied by his dog Fred, as the porter.  From their former employer, Louisa takes along her loyal Welsh assistant and friend Mary.

Rounding out the principal cast is Major Toby Smith-Barton, an upper-class, retired Army officer. The Major enjoys wagering on the horse races and ends up unable to pay his hotel bill. Reluctant to "toss him out on the street" and liking the man, Louisa offers him a position: general adviser, bellhop and greeter.

Charlie and Louisa eventually have a very passionate romance. Infatuated with Charlie, Louisa begins to neglect both the hotel and her cooking. Recognizing what is happening, the Major steps in and has a discreet word with Charles. Knowing how much the establishment means to Louisa, Charlie leaves for an extended stay in America, giving her a chance to refocus on her business. Grief-stricken at first, Louisa eventually regains her balance and makes the Bentinck a great success, only to discover that she is pregnant.  Eventually, Louisa secretly gives birth to their illegitimate daughter Lottie. Louisa accepts Charlie's suggestion that Lottie be discreetly adopted by a young couple who work on his estate. Later, Charlie and Louisa agree it is best they remain friends, not lovers.

Upon the death of his father, Charlie inherits the family fortune and the title of Lord Haslemere.  With Louisa's approval, Charlie marries another woman. He tells Louisa that if his marriage has any hope of working, he will have to be away from her.

However, when Charlie's wife later dies, he and Louisa renew their relationship. They decide to postpone their wedding until the end of the First World War. However, Charlie dies of a head injury received while fighting in the trenches. Louisa is grief-stricken, but gradually recovers.

Louisa informs the teenage Lottie her true parentage. Lottie accepts her mother's offer to take her to London. Louisa, not quite knowing what to do with her, eventually sends her to a Swiss finishing school to become a lady. When Lottie returns, she has her heart set on being a singer instead, much to Louisa's initial disapproval.

Louisa's parents occasionally make an appearance.  She is on very good terms with her ineffectual, but loving father, but not with her critical, abrasively selfish mother. Late in the series, Louisa's father dies, but not before giving his modest savings to his granddaughter to help her pursue her singing career. Louisa becomes reconciled to Lottie's career choice.

Cast
Gemma Jones as Louisa Trotter (née Leyton)
Victoria Plucknett as Mary 
John Welsh as  Merriman
John Cater as  Starr
Richard Vernon as Major  Smith-Barton
Christopher Cazenove as Charles "Charlie" Tyrrell, later Lord Haslemere
Mary Healey as Mrs Cochrane, Louisa's head cook at the Bentinck
Doreen Mantle as Mrs Catchpole, Lord Henry's housekeeper
Sammie Winmill as Ethel, a maid at the Bentinck
Holly De Jong as Violet, another maid
Donald Burton as Augustus Trotter
June Brown as Mrs Violet Leyton
John Rapley as Mr Ernest Leyton
Lalla Ward as Lottie, Louisa's daughter. Ward is only eight years and six months younger than Gemma Jones. Philippa Shackleton played Lottie as a child in one episode.
Bryan Coleman as Lord Henry Norton, Louisa's employer for part of the first series, beginning in the first episode
Christine Pollon as Aunt Gwyneth, Mary's aunt and occasional seamstress at the Bentinck
George Pravda as Monsieur Alex
Roger Hammond as the Prince of Wales, later King Edward VII
Martin Shaw as Arthur, Louisa's brother
Joanna David as Lady Margaret Hazlemere

Episodes

Series 1

Series 2

References

External links

BBC television dramas
Television series set in the 1900s
Television series set in the 1910s
Television series set in the 1920s
1976 British television series debuts
1977 British television series endings
1970s British drama television series
English-language television shows
Television shows set in London